This is a list of assets owned by Vivendi.

Television and film
 Canal+ Group
 Metropolitan France
 Canal+ (Television)
Canal+ Cinéma
Canal+ Sport
Canal+ Séries
Canal+ Décalé
Canal+ Docs
Canal+ Kids
Ciné+
Ciné+ Premier
Ciné+ Frisson
Ciné+ Émotion
Ciné+ Classic
 Clique TV
 Foot+
 Rugby+
 Polar+
 InfoSport+
 Seasons
Mezzo TV
Planète+ (France)
 Planète+ A&E
 Planète+ Crime+Investigation
Comédie+
Télétoon+
Piwi+
CanalPlay
 Canal+ International
CNews
C8
CStar
 MyCanal
OCS (30%)
OCS Choc
OCS City
OCS Geants
OCS Max
 Luxembourg 
Canal+ Luxembourg s.a.r.l.
M7 Group
Canal Digitaal
Direct One
HD Austria
Focus Sat
Skylink
TV Vlaanderen
Télésat
 Poland
Platforma Canal+ (51%)
Canal+ Premium
 Canal+ Family (Poland)
 Canal+ Film
Canal+ Now
 Canal+ Dokument
 Canal+ Seriale
 Canal+1 (Poland)
 Canal+ 4K Ultra HD
Canal+ Kuchnia
Canal+ Domo
Canal+ Sport (Poland)
 Canal+ Sport 1
 Canal+ Sport 2
 Canal+ Sport 3
 Canal+ Sport 4
nSport+
Teletoon+ (Poland)
MiniMini+
 Planete+ (Poland)
 Novelas+ (Poland)
Ale Kino+
 Vietnam
K+
K+NS
K+PC
K+PM
 Canal+ Régie
 Canal+ (TV provider)
 StudioCanal (Film)
StudioCanal UK
 Elevation Sales (joint venture with Lionsgate UK)
 StudioCanal Australia
 StudioCanal GmbH
StudioCanal Home Entertainment
TANDEM Productions (Germany)
 Paddington and Company Ltd (owner of Paddington Bear)
 The Copyrights Group Ltd
 Harvey Unna and Stephen Durbridge Limited
Red Production Company (United Kingdom)
 SAM Productions ApS (Scandinavian)
 SunnyMarch TV (20%)
 Umban Myth Films (20%)
 Bambú Producciones (33%)
 Lailaps Films
Rok Studios
British Pathé

Vivendi Village
 Vivendi Ticketing (France and UK)
 See Tickets
 See Tickets USA
 Digitick
 Flavorus
 MyBestPro
 Watchever
 L’Olympia

Video games
 Gameloft

Advertising and public relations
 Havas

Publishing
 Editis
 Prisma Media
Capital (France)
Femme Actuelle (France)
Geo (Germany)
Gala (France)
Prima (France)
VSD (France)
Voici (France)

Equity investments
 Lagardère Group (57.35%)
 TIM (23.94%)
 Banijay (32.9%)

Other assets
 Dailymotion

Former assets
 NBCUniversal (20% stake, now fully owned by Comcast)
 Gaiam Vivendi Entertainment (division of UMGD, now owned by Cinedigm)
 Universal Music Group (60% stake, became independent in September 2021)
 Activision Blizzard (5.8% stake, became independent in September 2013)
 Maroc Telecom (53% stake, now owned by Etisalat)
 SFR (Sold to Altice)
 Global Village Telecom (Sold to Telefônica Vivo)
 Vivendi Environnement (Divested through IPO between 2000 and 2002, now known as Veolia)
 Ubisoft (shares sold on 20 March 2018 to various investors)

See also
 Lists of corporate assets

References

External links
 Columbia Journalism Review, "Who Owns What"

Assets
Vivendi